In United States environmental law, a non-attainment area is an area considered to have air quality worse than the National Ambient Air Quality Standards as defined in the Clean Air Act Amendments of 1970 (P.L. 91-604, Sec. 109). Non-attainment areas must have and implement a plan to meet the standard, or risk losing some forms of federal financial assistance. An area may be a non-attainment area for one pollutant and an "attainment area" for others.

References 

Environmental law in the United States